Jhol railway station (Sindhi: جهول ريلوي اسٽيشن) is located in Pakistan.

See also
 List of railway stations in Pakistan
 Pakistan Railways

References

External links

Railway stations in Sindh
Railway stations on Mirpur Khas–Nawabshah Branch Line